María Isabel Lloret Ivorra (born 4 June 1971 in Villajoyosa, Alicante), better known as Maisa Lloret, is a retired Spanish rhythmic gymnast, currently a Valencian politician.

She competed for Spain in the rhythmic gymnastics all-around competition at the 1988 Summer Olympics in Seoul, placing fifth overall.

References

External links 
 

1971 births
Living people
Spanish rhythmic gymnasts
Gymnasts at the 1988 Summer Olympics
Olympic gymnasts of Spain
People from Villajoyosa
Sportspeople from the Province of Alicante